This article lists events from the year 2017 in Mali

Incumbents
 President – Ibrahim Boubacar Keïta 
 Prime Minister – Modibo Keita (until April 9); Abdoulaye Idrissa Maïga (from April 10)

Events
18 January – 77 people were killed in the 2017 Gao bombing, the deadliest terrorist attack in Malian history.
18 June – June 2017 Bamako attack
Date unknown – Two U.S. Navy SEALs and two Marines are accused of murdering U.S. Army Green Beret Logan Melgar while serving on an undisclosed mission in Mali.

Deaths

References

Links

 
Years of the 21st century in Mali
Mali
Mali
2010s in Mali